François Sourou Okioh (born 1950 Léma, Dassa-Zoumè is a Beninese screenwriter, director, producer, writer and poet. He has worked on more than a hundred documentaries and TV films.

He studied at the Film and TV School of the Academy of Performing Arts in Prague. In 1973 he founded the Association Culture Communication et Développement (ACCD).

References 

Living people
1950 births
Documentary film directors
Academy of Performing Arts in Prague alumni
Beninese film directors